The Constitution of Liberty is the magnum opus of Austrian economist and 1974 Nobel Memorial Prize in Economic Sciences recipient Friedrich A. Hayek. First published in 1960 by the University of Chicago Press, the book is considered Hayek’s classic statement on the ideals of freedom and liberty, ideals that he believes have guided—and must continue to guide—the growth of Western civilization. It is an interpretation of civilization as being made possible by the fundamental principles of liberty, which the author presents as prerequisites for wealth and growth, rather than liberty proceeding from wealth and growth. Hayek narrowly defines "Liberty" as absence of coercion by any person or institution.
The Constitution of Liberty was notably held up at a British Conservative Party policy meeting and banged on the table by Margaret Thatcher, who reportedly interrupted a presentation to indicate, in reference to the book, that "This is what we believe".

Contents

Part I – The Value of Freedom 

 1. Liberty and Liberties
 2. The Creative Powers of a Free Civilization
 3. The Common Sense of Progress
 4. Freedom, Reason, and Tradition
 5. Responsibility and Freedom
 6. Equality, Value, and Merit
 7. Majority Rule
 8. Employment and Independence

Part II – Freedom and the Law 

 9. Coercion and the State
 10. Law, Commands, and Order
 11. The Origins of the Rule of Law
 12. The American Contribution: Constitutionalism
 13. Liberalism and Administration: The Rechtsstaat
 14. The Safeguards of Individual Liberty
 15. Economic Policy and the Rule of Law
 16. The Decline of the Law

Part III – Freedom in the Welfare State 

 17. The Decline of Socialism and the Rise of the Welfare State
 18. Labor Unions and Employment
 19. Social Security
 20. Taxation and Redistribution
 21. The Monetary Framework
 22. Housing and Town Planning
 23. Agriculture and Natural Resources
 24. Education and Research

Postscript: Why I am Not a Conservative

Reception
The Constitution of Liberty was placed 9th on the list of the 100 best non-fiction books of the twentieth century compiled by the biweekly conservative magazine National Review.

See also 

 The Road To Serfdom (1944), Hayek's most well-known work.

Editions 
 1960. The Constitution of Liberty, Chicago: University of Chicago Press. 
 1960. The Constitution of Liberty, London: Routledge and Kegan Paul.
 1963. The Constitution of Liberty, London: Routledge and Kegan Paul.
 1972. The Constitution of Liberty, Gateway edition, paperback. Chicago: Regnery.
 1976. The Constitution of Liberty, London: Routledge and Kegan Paul.
 1978. The Constitution of Liberty, Phoenix edition, paperback. Chicago: University of Chicago Press.
 1990. The Constitution of Liberty, Paperback. London: Routledge.
 2006. The Constitution of Liberty, New edition, Routledge Classics. London: Routledge.
 2011. The Constitution of Liberty: The Definitive Edition, Ronald Hamowy, ed., v. 17, The Collected Works of F A. Hayek. University of Chicago Press.

References

External links
 

1960 non-fiction books
Books about capitalism
Books by Friedrich Hayek
Conservatism
University of Chicago Press books